Franz Sebastian Obermayr (born 25 May 1952) is an Austrian politician who served as a Member of the European Parliament (MEP) from 2009 to 2019. He was the President of the European Alliance for Freedom from 2012 to 2015.

References

External links
 

1952 births
Living people
Freedom Party of Austria MEPs
MEPs for Austria 2009–2014
MEPs for Austria 2014–2019
Articles containing video clips